Oroton is Australia’s oldest luxury fashion company founded in 1938. The company’s main product category is leather bags for women and men. The company sells other products such as eyewear, accessories and small leather goods, and launched its ready-to-wear apparel line in 2019. The company is based in Sydney and has close to 50 stores and concessions across Australia and Malaysia. Sophie Holt was appointed creative director in 2018. Oroton revolutionised fashion in Australia in the 1950s by replacing traditional materials used for evening bags with interwoven metallic mesh - a solely utilitarian material at the time. Oroton is known for its signature mesh evening bags, which are still sold today.

History
Oroton started as a private company established by Boyd Lane under the name Boyd Lane & Co Pty Ltd and became a public company under the name Oroton International in 1987.

In 2002, the company was renamed the OrotonGroup.

In November 2017, Oroton announced it was entering into voluntary administration.

In April 2018, the brand saw a significant increase in sales after Meghan Markle wore an Oroton crossbody bag for an official royal appearance with Prince Harry at London's Commonwealth Heads Of Government Meeting.

In July 2018, the company was purchased by Will Vicars and re-instated as a private company, with David Kesby appointed as CEO.

References

External links
 
 https://www.broadsheet.com.au/national/fashion/article/oroton-appoints-country-roads-sophie-holt-whats-next

Companies listed on the Australian Securities Exchange
Fashion accessory brands
Retail companies established in 1938
1938 establishments in Australia
Clothing brands of Australia
Luxury brands
High fashion brands